The Shrewsbury and Welshpool Railway (S&WR) is a standard gauge railway which connects the towns of Shrewsbury and Welshpool. It opened in 1861 and the majority of the railway continues in use.

History

Incorporation
The S&WR was incorporated in an Act of Parliament in 1856. Although initially an independent company, the line was to be operated and maintained by the London and North Western Railway (LNWR).

Opening
Construction under the Act began in 1859, and by 1861 the line from Shrewsbury to Minsterley was completed, and opened on 14 February 1861. Construction of the main line to Welshpool was completed later in 1861 and officially opened on 27 January 1862.

Minsterley branch

The Minsterley branch served the agricultural communities of the area, but its main purpose was to carry lead from the mines along the Stiperstones hills. These mines were connected to the S&WR at Pontesbury by the  narrow gauge Snailbeach District Railways which opened in 1873 and closed in 1959. The Minsterley branch closed for passenger service in 1951 and for freight traffic in the mid 1960s.

Main line
The main line of the S&WR continued in use as the main route from Shrewsbury to Welshpool and, via the ex-Cambrian Railways main line, to mid-Wales and Machynlleth. The railway was jointly operated by the LNWR (LM&SR after 1923) and the Great Western Railway until nationalisation, when it became part of British Railways.  All of the intermediate stations were subsequently closed in September 1960.

References

External links
Shrewsbury and Welshpool Railway @ railbrit.co.uk

Railway companies established in 1856
Railway lines opened in 1861
1861 establishments in the United Kingdom